"Helpless Rain" is Mika Nakashima's fourth single. Track two was a remix featuring hip-hop musicians Heartsdales and Verbal of M-Flo. The single was released on May 15, 2002. "Helpless Rain" sold 82,830 copies, reaching number eight on Oricon.

Track listing
Helpless Rain
Helpless Rain (But I'm Fallin' Too Deep)
Destiny's Lotus (Version)
Helpless Rain (Instrumental)

2002 singles
Mika Nakashima songs
2002 songs